Manakau is a settlement in the Horowhenua District, at the boundary of the Manawatū-Whanganui and Wellington regions of New Zealand's North Island. It lies 8 km north of Otaki and 12 km south of Levin, and is connected to both via State Highway 1, which skirts Manakau's western edge. The township 5 km inland from the coast of the Tasman Sea.

In 1886, Manakau became the first place to have a railway station on the newly completed Wellington-Manawatu railway line. The line is now part of the North Island Main Trunk line, but the station itself has long been closed. Industries in the area include horticulture, and there are several plant nurseries in or close to the township.

The name Manakau comes from the Māori words mana (prestige, authority) and kau (alone, sole). The name refers to an invasion of the district by notable tribal leader Te Rauparaha, who subdued the area on the strength of his prestige alone, with the local residents putting up no resistance. The streets are named after Māori members of Parliament.

Marae

Manakau has two marae, affiliated with local hapū from the Ngāti Raukawa iwi. Tūkorehe Marae and its meeting house of the same name are affiliated with the hapū of Ngāti Tūkorehe; Wehi Wehi Marae and its meeting house of the same name are affiliated with the hapū of Ngāti Wehi Wehi.

In October 2020, the Government committed $482,108 from the Provincial Growth Fund to Ngāti Tūkorehe to upgrade its Tūkorehe Marae, creating 17.5 positions.

Demographics

The population of Manakau was 420 in the 2018 New Zealand census, an increase of 87 (26.1%) since the 2013 census, and an increase of 81 (23.9%) since the 2006 census. There were 204 males and 219 females, giving a sex ratio of 0.93 males per female. Ethnicities were 363 people  (86.4%) European/Pākehā, 78 (18.6%) Māori, 9 (2.1%) Pacific peoples, and 18 (4.3%) Asian (totals add to more than 100% since people could identify with multiple ethnicities). Of the total population, 66 people  (15.7%) were under 15 years old, 48 (11.4%) were 15–29, 186 (44.3%) were 30–64, and 120 (28.6%) were over 65.

Education

References

External links
 

Populated places in Manawatū-Whanganui
Horowhenua District